Havnar Bóltfelag (HB, lit. 'Harbour football club')  is a Faroese football club, and is one of the oldest in the Faroe Islands. The club was founded in 1904, and is based in the city of Tórshavn. Home matches are played in Gundadalur and they compete in the Faroe Islands Premier League.

History

HB Tórshavn was founded in October 1904. The club's first board was elected in a meeting, on 14 November 1904. The board consisted of three people: Mads Andrias Winther, Joan Pauli Joensen and Jakup Mouritsen. The future mayor of Tórshavn (1909–12), Mads Andrias Winther, was HB's first chairman. HB's first match against TB Tvøroyri took place on 23 May 1909, in Tvøroyri. The match ended in a 2–2 draw. Two months later, on 18 July 1909, a second match was organized against TB Tvøroyri, this time held in Tórshavn. HB won the match 3–1.
The first match against future rivals KÍ Klaksvík was held on 16 July 1911, which finished in a 3–3 draw.

In 1942, a national league was formed in the Faroe Islands. The first few seasons weren't very successful for HB. Later their results improved and they finished runners-up in 1948, 1949, 1953 and 1954. Then in 1955, HB won the double, by winning the league and the first ever national cup competition, beating KÍ Klaksvík in the final. HB went on to win many more trophies; despite this by 1970, KÍ Klaksvík were the most successful club in the Faroe Islands at the time. That year HB were due to play KÍ Klaksvík in the national cup final. But the final never took place, as KÍ refused to play the final in Tórshavn. HB was not named the winners of the cup that year, even though KÍ failed to appear. HB were the current holders at the time, after beating B36 Tórshavn in the cup final, the previous year. They finished runners-up in 1970 after KÍ Klaksvík won their 5th title in a row. It was the fourth time HB had finished runners-up in the league in the past 4 seasons. The following year it was HB v TB in the cup final, the match went ahead this time and HB won. In the final round of the league there was fighting in the match between HB and KÍ players. HB were the eventual winners of the league and KÍ finished runners-up. HB also won the cup in 1972 and 1973, making them 11 times winners, and winning the cup for 5 consecutive years. They also won the cup 5 times in a row, in the years between 1978 and 1982. HB are the only club in the Faroe Islands to achieve this, with other clubs only having won the cup 2 years consecutively. By this time they had won the Faroe Islands Cup many more times than all other clubs in the Faroe Islands, but KÍ still held the most league titles.

In 1992, clubs in the Faroe Islands took part in European competitions for the first time, after the Faroe Islands Football Association became a member of UEFA a couple of years earlier. HB Tórshavn made their European debut in 1993 against RAF Jelgava in the Cup Winners Cup qualifying round. HB lost the first leg 0–1 away from home, but due to problems with their travel to the Faroe Islands the opponents did not show up for the return leg and HB were awarded a 3–0 win. HB advanced into the first round, but were knocked out by FC U Craiova of Romania. This would turn out to be the only time HB Torshavn or any other Faroese club managed to get through the qualifying round(s) of any European Club Competition to date (June 2018). Since then HB has been involved in European competitions every season except for 2002–03 and 2012–13.

In 2003, HB won the league and equalled KÍ Klaksvík's record of 17 league titles. A year later HB won the league again and bettered KÍ's record, making HB Tórshavn the most successful team in the Faroe Islands, as they had now won the most national cups and won the most league titles.

HB won the league in 2013 and participated in the 2014–15 UEFA Champions League.

In November 2017, HB hired Heimir Guðjónsson, who had previously guided Fimleikafélag Hafnarfjarðar to five Icelandic championships, as manager. On 23 September 2018 the club won the Faroe Islands Premier League after defeating second placed KÍ, 2–1. With the victory, no team could catch HB even with four matches remaining.

Current squad
As of 12 April 2022

Notable former players
Former players who have played for a national team and/or for a fully pro league.
  Heine Fernandez
  Uni Arge
  Jan Dam
  Jón Rói Jacobsen
  Rógvi Jacobsen
  Kaj Leo Johannesen
  Julian Johnsson
  Vagnur Mohr Mortensen
  Gunnar Nielsen
  Andrew av Fløtum

Coaches of HB Tórshavn

  Ole Skouboe (1983–84)
  Sverri Jacobsen (1984)
  Jóhan Nielsen (1987–89)
  Jógvan Nordbúð (1990–91)
  Sverri Jacobsen (1992–93)
  Jóannes Jakobsen (1994–95)
  Jóhan Nielsen (1996–97)
  Oddbjørn Joensen (11 June 1997 – 31 December 1997)
  Ion Geolgău (1997–02)
  Jóannes Jakobsen & Kári Nielsen (2002)
  Frank Skytte (1 January 2003 – 31 December 2003)
  Heine Fernandez (2004–05)
  Julian Frank Hansen (2005)
  Krzysztof Popczyński (1 January 2006 – 27 June 2007)
  Heðin Askham (interim) (1 July 2007 – 31 July 2007)
  Albert Ellefsen (2007)
  Rúni Nolsøe (2008)
  Rúni Nolsøe & Sámal Erik Hentze (1 August 2008 – 31 December 2009)
  Kristján Guðmundsson (1 January 2010 – 30 September 2010)
  Julian Hansen (19 September 2010 – 18 June 2011)
  Sigfríður Clementsen (1 June 2011 – 31 December 2012)
  Oddbjørn Joensen and Fróði Benjaminsen (1 January 2013 – 31 December 2013)
  Heðin Askham (1 January 2014 – 3 November 2017)
  Heimir Guðjónsson (3 November 2017 – 2019)
  Jens Berthel Askou (1 December 2019 – 4 January 2021) 
  Jonas Dal (9 January 2021 – 22 June 2021) 
  Kevin Schindler &  Allan Dybczak (4 August 2021 – 10 January 2022)
  Kim Engstrøm (11 January 2022 – 15 May 2022)
  Dalibor Savic (16 May 2022 – present)

Honours

Faroe Islands Premier League
Champions (24): 1955, 1960, 1963, 1964, 1965, 1971, 1973, 1974, 1975, 1978, 1981, 1982, 1988, 1990, 1998, 2002, 2003, 2004, 2006, 2009, 2010, 2013, 2018, 2020
Faroe Islands Cup
Winners (28): 1955, 1957, 1959, 1962, 1963, 1964, 1968, 1969, 1971, 1972, 1973, 1975, 1976, 1978, 1979, 1980, 1981, 1982, 1984, 1987, 1988, 1989, 1992, 1995, 1998, 2004, 2019, 2020
Faroe Islands Super Cup
Winners (4): 2009, 2010, 2019, 2021

Records

Biggest league win: HB vs. ÍF Fuglafjørður 14–1 (1971)
Biggest league defeat: HB vs. B36 Tórshavn 0–10 (1945)
Biggest cup win: HB vs. Skansin Tórshavn (Division 4) 22–0 (1995)
Biggest cup defeat: TB Tvøroyri vs. HB 6–2 (1977)
Biggest European cup win: HB vs.  Budućnost Podgorica 4–0 (2021) UEFA Europa Conference League
Biggest European defeat:  Tromsø vs. HB 10–0 (1995) Intertoto Cup

UEFA club competition record

Matches

Notes

 PR: Preliminary round
 1R: First round
 QR: Qualifying round
 1Q: First qualifying round
 2Q: Second qualifying round

References

External links

Official website 
Official Facebook 

 
Association football clubs established in 1904
1904 establishments in the Faroe Islands
Football clubs in Tórshavn